Bashir Saadawi (1884 – 17 January 1957) was a Libyan politician and the founder and leader of the Libyan National Congress Party.

Bashir Saadawi was one of the major figures who contributed to independence of Libya. However, after King Idris I was crowned as King of Libya, all parties were disbanded and Saadawi was exiled to Beirut where he lived for the rest of his life, dying there on 17 January 1957.

His body was returned to be buried in Libya in 1970.

References

1884 births
1957 deaths
Libyan politicians